Mount Wilson is a village located in the Blue Mountains region of New South Wales, Australia. At the 2021 census, the village of Mount Wilson had a population of 81 people.

Description

It is completely surrounded by the Blue Mountains National Park, a World Heritage Area. It has been partly developed as a residential area, with elaborate gardens that have become a tourist attraction. The area is particularly popular in the autumn, when the red and orange leaves give it extra colour. According to some, the "well organised locals have managed to resist the tidal wave of development which swept through the other mountain towns."

History

The Mount Wilson area was surveyed in 1868 by Edward Wyndham. It was subsequently named after Bowie Wilson, the then Secretary for Lands in the Government of New South Wales. The new township became popular as a summer retreat for the wealthy in the latter part of the 19th century. Extensive gardens were planted around the houses there, taking advantage of the volcanic soils. Historical features that can still be seen include St George's Church, which was built by the children of Henry Marcus Clark and consecrated in 1916; and the house Withycombe, in The Avenue, which was built by George Henry Cox, a grandson of William Cox, who built the first road over the Blue Mountains.

The novelist Patrick White spent some of his youth there, writing about the place in his 1981 memoir Flaws in the Glass; his parents had lived in Mount Wilson between 1912 and 1937. In Flaws in the Glass, he referred to "one of those tedious Australian, would-be tourists attractions called Chinaman's Hat," a reference to a local rock formation.

Heritage listings 
Mount Wilson has a number of heritage-listed sites, including:
 68-78 The Avenue: Wynstay Estate

Activities

Apart from visiting the gardens for which the area is famous, it is also possible to do a number of walks in places like Waterfall Reserve, the rainforest pocket in Davies Lane, the Cathedral of Ferns, Pheasants Cave, Chinamans Hat and, for more experienced walkers, the track to the Wollangambe River. There are also lookouts, e.g. Wynnes Rocks Lookout and Du Faurs Rocks Lookout. There are no authorised camping areas, but it is possible to camp in the Waterfall Reserve picnic area. The area offers plenty of scope for photography. The village offers easy and delightful cycling on the quiet roads, outside of busy autumn and spring weekends. The 10 km ride to Mt Irvine offers experienced cyclists a very beautiful ride on bitumen road through rainforest and magnificent Blue Mountains Ash forests.

See also

List of mountains in New South Wales

References

External links 

 Mount Wilson Website
 Mt Wilson to Bilpin Bush Run - held each August
 Article about Mount Wilson in the Sydney Morning Herald
  [CC-By-SA]

Suburbs of the City of Blue Mountains
Towns in New South Wales